Netechma bicerithium is a species of moth of the family Tortricidae. It is found in Peru.

References

Moths described in 1997
Netechma